Tracy Nelson may refer to:

Tracy Nelson (actress) (born 1963), American actress
Tracy Nelson (singer) (born 1944), American singer